The Commissioners of Irish Lights, often shortened to Irish Lights or CIL, is the body that serves as the general lighthouse authority for Northern Ireland and the Republic of Ireland and their adjacent seas and islands.  As the lighthouse authority for the island of Ireland it oversees the coastal lights and navigation marks provided by the local lighthouse authorities, the county councils and port authorities.

It is funded by light dues paid by ships calling at ports in the Republic of Ireland, pooled with dues raised similarly in the United Kingdom. This recognizes that a large volume of shipping, typically transatlantic, relies on the lights provided by Irish Lights.

History

Signal fires to guide shipping have long existed.  Hook Head has the oldest nearly continuous light in Ireland,  originally a signal fire or beacon tended by the monk Dubhán in the fifth century. Monks continued to maintain the light until the Cromwellian conquest of Ireland in 1641.

King Charles II re-established the lighthouse in 1667.  He granted a patent for the erection of six lighthouses to Robert Reading, some replacing older lighthouses, at Hook Head, Baily Lighthouse at Howth Head, Howth sand-bar, Old Head of Kinsale, Barry Oge's castle (now Charlesfort, near Kinsale), and the Isle of Magee.

In 1704 Queen Anne transferred the lighthouses around the Irish coast to the Revenue Commissioners.

The Commissioners of Irish Lights were established under an Act of the Parliament of Ireland passed in 1786 and entitled An Act for Promoting the Trade of Dublin, by rendering its Port and Harbour more commodious (26 Geo. III, c. xix). Lighthouses were not included until an 1810 Act of the Parliament of the United Kingdom of Great Britain and Ireland. These Acts, modified by the Irish Lights Commissioners (Adaptation) Order, 1935, remain the legislative basis for the CIL.

Irish Lights has moved its headquarters from Dublin to a purpose-built new building in Harbour Road, Dún Laoghaire.

Ships

Granuaile III

The commissioners currently have only one light tender in service named . The hull was built at Galați shipyard, Romania, in 2000 and fitted out at Damen Shipyards in the Netherlands. She is the third vessel named Granuaile to have served the Commissioners. Granuaile II was in service between 1970 and 2000, and she was preceded by the first Granuaile from 1948 to 1970.
Because of the automation of lighthouses, and the extensive use of helicopters by the Commissioners, CIL now need only one tender in service. The ship has diesel-electric propulsion and is extremely manoeuvrable, and is therefore ideal for her role in maintaining the automatic navigation buoys in Irish waters. In 2003 she was involved in the recovery of the fishing boat Pisces, which sank off Fethard, County Wexford, in July 2002.

Other vessels
Princess Alexandra (1863–1904)
Tearaght (1892–1928) – see Kingstown Lifeboat Disaster
Moya (1893–1905)
Ierne (1898–1954)
Alexandra (1904–1955)
Deirdre (1919–1927)
Nabro (1926–1949)
Isolda (1928–1940) (Sunk off the Saltee Islands County Wexford by German aircraft)
Discovery II (1947–1948)
Valonia (1947–1962)
Granuaile (1948–1970)
Blaskbeg (1953–1955)
Isolda (1953–1976)
Ierne II (1955–1971)
Atlanta (1959–1988)
Granuaile II (1970–2000)
Gray Seal (1988–1994)

Flags
The Commissioners of Irish Lights is a cross-border body, with its headquarters in Dublin. The current flag of the Irish Lights features lightships and lighthouses between the arms of the St. Patrick's Cross. The St. George's Cross was used until 1970. CIL vessels in Northern Ireland fly the Blue Ensign defaced with the Commissioner's badge and those in the Republic fly the Irish tricolour.

Infrastructure

The CIL operate and maintain the majority of the aids to navigation around the Irish coastline. This includes 66 lighthouses, 20 beacons and over 100 buoys. It also operates more than 100 automatic identification system transmitters, and 24 radar beacons.

See also
 Lighthouses in Ireland
 Lightvessels in Ireland

References

External links
Official website

1786 establishments in Ireland

Lighthouse organizations
Dún Laoghaire
Water transport in Ireland
All-Ireland organisations
Department for Transport